Antwon Burton (born June 11, 1983) is a former American football defensive tackle. He was signed by the Denver Broncos as an undrafted free agent in 2006. He played college football at Temple.

Burton was also a member of the Cincinnati Bengals, Kansas City Chiefs, St. Louis Rams, Carolina Panthers, Florida Tuskers, Sacramento Mountain Lions and Virginia Destroyers.

Early years
Burton was a First-team All-State and All-Western New York selection as a senior at Cleveland Hill High School in Cheektowaga, New York.

College career
Burton played 22 games (16 starts) and totaled 96 tackles in two seasons at Temple University after transferring from Erie Community College in Orchard Park, N.Y. As a senior in 2005, Burton played 11 games (10 starts), posting 66 tackles (26 solo), five tackles-for-losses, four fumble recoveries, three forced fumbles and three pass breakups. Burton concluded his collegiate career by playing in the East-West Shrine Game. Before the start of his senior year, he was named one of the top five independent pro prospects by the College Football News. He played 11 games (6 starts) in his first year at Temple as a junior in 2003 before missing the 2004 season with a foot injury. He posted 6.5 sacks and was voted First-team All-Northeast Conference at Erie Community College in 2002.

Professional career

Pre-draft
At his pro day workout at Temple University, Burton measured 6-1 and 308 pounds. He ran a 5.39 forty-yard dash and did 31 reps of 225 pounds. He also had a 31" vertical leap and a broad jump of 9'5"

Denver Broncos
Burton, who entered the NFL with the Broncos as a college free agent on May 3, 2006, was signed to Denver's practice squad after training camp. He was signed to the Broncos' active roster on November 12, 2006, and made his professional
debut with an assisted tackle at Oakland on November 12, 2006. He was declared inactive for the rest of the season. In 2007, he played in six games and made eight tackles (five solo). He was waived on November 13, 2007, and signed November 14, 2007 to Broncos practice squad, where he finished the season.

Cincinnati Bengals
Burton signed with Bengals as a free agent on May 4, 2008. Burton was on the roster of the Kansas City Chiefs and St. Louis Rams in 2008 but did not play in a game.

Carolina Panthers
Burton signed with the Carolina Panthers on September 22, 2009, after they lost Ma'ake Kemoeatu and Louis Leonard for the season. He was waived on October 20, after the Panthers acquired Tank Tyler from Kansas City.

Post NFL Career Stats
Burton currently works & runs his own gym "Next Level Performance" in Pueblo, Colorado as an athletic trainer and performs a great deal of philanthropic workings in the town. Here he trains elite athletes in the southern Colorado area, where he also met his wife.

References

1983 births
Living people
Players of American football from Buffalo, New York
American football defensive tackles
SUNY Erie alumni
Temple Owls football players
Denver Broncos players
Cincinnati Bengals players
Kansas City Chiefs players
St. Louis Rams players
Carolina Panthers players
Florida Tuskers players
Sacramento Mountain Lions players